Sacramento Republic FC is an American professional soccer team based in Sacramento, California, that plays in the Western Conference of the USL Championship, the second level in US soccer. Co-founded by Warren Smith and Joe Wagoner in 2012, the team started play in 2014 at the 20,231-seat Hughes Stadium, before moving midseason to their current home at Heart Health Park. Republic won the 2014 USL championship and have made the playoffs four times.

The team submitted an expansion bid for the top level Major League Soccer in January 2017. On May 15, 2017, MLS bid proponent Sac Soccer & Entertainment Holdings, led by Kevin Nagle, officially acquired Sacramento Republic FC from president and co-founder Warren Smith. On October 21, 2019, MLS announced that Sacramento Republic would be the 29th team in MLS, originally slated to start in 2022, and later pushed to 2023. However, on February 26, 2021, the expansion to the MLS was placed on indefinite hiatus. The team is working with the city of Sacramento to build a $226 million stadium in the large Railyards urban infill project.

History
On December 3, 2012, USL Pro announced that a Sacramento expansion team would join the league for the 2014 season. On July 15, 2013, Predrag "Preki" Radosavljević was announced as head coach of the new franchise. The official name of the team and team shield were decided by fan vote. On July 18, 2013, the franchise officially announced the team name Sacramento Republic FC during the first annual Sacramento Soccer Day.
As of April 2015, the team had sold more than 9,500 season-tickets.

2014: First-year championship 

Republic FC made their home debut on April 26, 2014, at Hughes Stadium, losing 2–1 to the Harrisburg City Islanders, before a sellout crowd of 20,231. This figure nearly doubled the previous USL regular season single game attendance record of 10,697. The following match, a 2–1 win over Orange County Blues FC, drew a slightly smaller crowd of 17,414. Eventually, all their home games were sellouts except this one.

Republic FC inaugurated their new 8,000 seat, soccer-specific stadium, Bonney Field at Cal Expo, on June 20, 2014. They defeated the Colorado Rapids Reserve team 4–3. Mike Fucito scored the winning goal in the 84th minute.

On July 27, 2014, the team broke the USL regular season attendance record of 112,748, previously set by Orlando City SC. Their total attendance was 182,107 (158,107 regular season; 24,000 in the playoffs).

Republic FC finished the regular season in 2nd place behind Orlando City SC with a 17-win, 4-tie and 7-loss record. They defeated the Wilmington Hammerheads 4–1 in the Quarterfinals. Rodrigo López scored a hat trick, including the game-winner in stoppage time, to defeat LA Galaxy II 3–2 in the Semifinals—a comeback victory dubbed "The Miracle at Bonney" by Republic fans. Sacramento won the USL Championship by defeating the Harrisburg City Islanders 2–0 on goals from Octavio Guzman and Thomas Stewart. López was named the Championship MVP. Preki was named Coach of the Year. Nemanja Vuković was named Defender of the Year. Both López and Vuković were named to the All-League First Team.

2015–2021 

Republic FC's second season saw them play in an expanded Bonney Field. 2015 also saw the business arm of the NFL side San Francisco 49ers and also NBA side Sacramento Kings venture into soccer, investing in Sacramento Republic in January 2015 with future plans should the club venture into the MLS as a franchise.

Sacramento lost their first game of the season 4–2 away to Seattle Sounders FC 2. They soon picked up form and saw them beat Sonoma County Sol and Chula Vista FC 4–2 and 7–3 respectively in the US Open Cup to reach the Fourth Round two years running. On July 7, the Republic announced that Head-Coach Preki would be leaving and was being replaced by Paul Buckle. Buckle's first game with the Republic was a friendly with Premier League side Sunderland on July 14, which Sacramento won 1–0.

Sacramento placed fourth in the USL Western Conference standings after a season-concluding draw with conference champions Orange County Blues. The Republic qualified for playoffs for the second consecutive year, losing to LA Galaxy II 1–0 in the first round.

On January 22, 2019, billionaire Ron Burkle, the lead investor in the Pittsburgh Penguins ice hockey team since 1999, was announced as the Sacramento Republic's lead investor to satisfy MLS requirements.

On September 19, 2019, Sacramento Republic FC was reported to be entering MLS as its 29th team, sources told CBS Sports. MLS called the report "erroneous" stating that they were still in "advanced discussions". A press conference was held on October 21, 2019, to award an expansion team to Sacramento with Sacramento Republic FC slated to begin play in 2022. Due to delays relating to the COVID-19 pandemic in California. Sacramento Republic and MLS announced that the team would instead play in 2023. On February 26, 2021, MLS then announced that lead investor Ron Burkle "had decided not to acquire an expansion team in Sacramento", and the Republic's bid to join MLS as an expansion team was placed on indefinite hold. Republic's 2021 troubles were not limited to off the pitch; the club missed the playoffs for the first time in its history, finishing 13th in the Western Conference with an 8W-12D-12L record.

2022: Open Cup magic 

With the return of the U.S. Open Cup after a two-year hiatus forced by the pandemic, the Republic made a historic run through the 2022 edition, becoming the first team from outside Major League Soccer to play for the trophy since Charleston Battery in 2008, and only the fourth since MLS began play in 1996. Sacramento defeated teams from four divisions of the United States soccer pyramid—Portland Timbers U23s of Open Division USL League Two, Central Valley Fuego FC of Division III USL League One, fellow Division II USLC side Phoenix Rising FC, and MLS clubs San Jose Earthquakes, LA Galaxy, and Sporting Kansas City—before falling to MLS side Orlando City, 3–0, in the final. The Open Cup run has also inspired hopes of reviving the Republic's MLS expansion bid through a new group of investors.

Colors and crest 

Republic FC's colors are old glory red, maple, and egg shell. The club crest is a classic shield that honors the Bear Flag, taking several colors from the flag itself. The crest also carries an image of a California grizzly bear, which is found on the state's flag and is California's official state animal, along with a nautical star, which is representative of, and in the same color as, the star on the Bear Flag. Below the bear is the motto of the city of Sacramento, "Urbs Indomita", in Latin meaning "Indomitable City".

Kit 

The club released the design of their inaugural home and away shirts on December 5, 2013. The kit manufacturer was Italian sportswear company Lotto, with UC Davis Children's Hospital as the shirt sponsor through the 2016 season. The home kit's dominant color is the club's signature color "Old Glory Red", and the away shirt is primarily white. Both Lotto kits featured a diagonal stripe of dark maroon, with the club crest positioned on the left side of the wearer's chest. The club's motto, "Urbs Indomita", was printed on the right sleeve. The third kit, unveiled before the 2015 season and US Open Cup, featured horizontal eggshell and white stripes and a star over the crest to commemorate the previous season's USL Championship.

On November 21, 2015, Republic FC announced a new partnership with Nike and unveiled new home and away kits for the 2016 USL season. The home kit is once again "Old Glory Red," while the away kit is now white and gray. Both designs omit the diagonal stripe in favor of vertical patterns. The new designs feature "Urbs Indomita" written on the back neckline.

UC Davis Children's Hospital, the kit sponsor since the club's inception and one of Republic FC's first corporate partners, renewed their sponsorship on July 22, 2016, for USL play beyond the year 2016. Moreover, UC Davis Health Systems announced it would become the shirt sponsor in MLS should Republic receive an expansion bid.

Sponsorship

Supporters 

Republic FC draws fans from a large region of Northern California, with many fans traveling from the eastern areas of the bay and as far north as Redding to watch matches.

The club's independent supporters' group is called the Tower Bridge Battalion. The group gets their name from the Tower Bridge, a central structure in downtown Sacramento that connects Sacramento proper to West Sacramento. The Tower Bridge Battalion occupies one area of the team's home stadium. Several chants have been coordinated for the Tower Bridge Battalion, which they yell throughout the match. Common instruments used by the Battalion are large drums, megaphones, and other noise-making items. The group has several coordinators that help to keep the crowd in unison during the match.

The Tower Bridge Battalion have been central in organizing fan support of a Major League Soccer expansion team in Sacramento. On September 19, 2014, the Battalion led a crowd of thousands through the streets in downtown Sacramento designed to showcase the area's fanbase for MLS officials.

Stadiums

Heart Health Park 

When the club was originally proposed, officials had planned on using Hughes Stadium, a 20,311 seater, open, multi-purpose stadium at Sacramento City College. On November 14, 2013, however, it was announced that Republic FC planned to play in a new 8,000 seat soccer-specific stadium being built on the grounds of Cal Expo. The proposed stadium would be funded and owned by Ovations Food Service and, if approved, was expected to be completed in time for the first match of the 2014 USL season. Because the new stadium at Cal Expo was not completed in time for the start of 2014 season matches, the club played its initial 2014 matches at Hughes Stadium. The new stadium was named Bonney Field, following a sponsorship deal for naming rights with Bonney Plumbing, Heating, Air and Rooter Service.

On June 20, 2014, the club played its inaugural match at the completed Bonney Field against the Colorado Rapids Reserves, winning the match 4–3. The game drew a sellout crowd of 8,000, significantly lower than the regular crowds at Hughes Stadium due to the smaller size of Bonney, but this number still remains very high for regular-season USL Pro matches.

In January 2015, expansion efforts at Bonney Field began to increase the seating at the stadium. Capacity for 2015 was expanded to 11,442, with added seats in the north endline and east sideline. In March 2017, Papa Murphy's Holdings, Inc. acquired the naming rights to the stadium, and Bonney Field was renamed Papa Murphy's Park. On May 5, 2021, the Sacramento Republic FC and Western Health Advantage agreed to a new naming rights deal that would change the name of the stadium to Heart Health Park.

Proposed Railyards stadium 

As part of team owners' efforts for the club to join MLS as an expansion team, Republic FC has announced intentions to build a 20,000 seat soccer-specific stadium in Downtown Sacramento. In August 2015, Republic FC announced the hiring of HNTB Corp as lead architects of the stadium project, which will be on the former site of the Sacramento Railyards. (HNTB previously designed two Northern California venues, Sutter Health Park in Sacramento and Levi's Stadium in Santa Clara.)

The concept design of the new stadium, based in part on fan input from a web survey and a series of workshops, was unveiled on December 1, 2015. Though designed with a closed bowl, the stadium will have separate stands on different sides to create a unique character for each one, an homage to classic English stadia like St James' Park. To meet the designer's stated goal of creating MLS's best home field advantage, the seating will feature the steepest grade in the MLS in and an untiered east side reminiscent of Westfalenstadion's Yellow Wall. On December 1, the evening of the design unveil, the Sacramento City Council voted 8–0 to approve a term sheet promoting construction of the 25,000-seat venue, with a target 2018 completion date if the club is accepted into MLS. The stadium is estimated to cost $226 million, and will be privately financed.

On April 2, 2019, Sacramento Republic FC released updated renderings of the proposed stadium. Additions to the previous design included a 360-degree concourse/pedestrian walkway, new seating at the canopy level on the west side of the stadium, and additional field-level seating areas, raising the cost to about $252 million. The team stated that if their MLS bid is accepted, they would likely begin construction on the stadium immediately, hoping to complete it by late 2021 or early 2022, in time for the 2022 MLS season. With the team being accepted into MLS on October 21, 2019, they were expected to complete construction for the 2023 season. The plans to build the stadium and join the league are on indefinite hiatus as of February 2021.

Players and technical staff

First-team roster

Technical staff

Team records

Year-by-year 

This is a partial list of the last five seasons completed by Republic. For the full season-by-season history, see List of Sacramento Republic FC seasons.

1. Avg. attendance include statistics from league matches only.

2. Top goalscorer(s) includes all goals scored in league, league playoffs, U.S. Open Cup, CONCACAF Champions League, FIFA Club World Cup, and other competitive continental matches.

Head coaches 

 Includes USL Regular season, USL Play-offs and U.S. Lamar Hunt Open Cup

Average attendances

Club captains

Honors

League 
 USL Championship
 Champions (1): 2014
 USL Championship Western Conference (Regular Season)
 Champions (1): 2016
 USL Playoffs
 Appearances (7): 2014, 2015, 2016, 2017, 2018, 2019, 2020
U.S. Open Cup
 Runners-up  (1): 2022

References

External links 

 

 
Association football clubs established in 2012
USL Championship teams
2012 establishments in California
Soccer clubs in California